High Street is a street in the medieval area of Dublin, Ireland.

Location
High Street runs parallel to the River Liffey, on high ground about 200 metres to its south, with Christ Church Cathedral on its east side, in the heart of Medieval Dublin.

History

This ridge of elevated land to the south of the Liffey was the traditional eastern terminus of the Slighe Mhór ("Great Way") that cut Ireland in half in prehistoric times, running along the Esker Riada. A community of farming and fishing Gaelic Irish people lived here by the 5th century AD, with a defensive fort in the vicinity of Cornmarket and High Street. In Anglo-Norman records the street was referred to as "altus vicus".

High Street was at the centre of Viking Dublin and Medieval Dublin (9th–13th centuries); Christ Church Cathedral is located immediately on its northeast end. It is south of the Viking settlement site at Wood Quay and east of Dublin Castle; it was the main street in the medieval period. Patrick FitzLeones, who was three times Mayor of Dublin in the late fifteenth century, bought a house on High Street in 1473.

St. Michael's Church was first built in 1076 and St. Audoen's Church was built on the north side of High Street in 1190. A marble cistern to contain the municipal water supply was built there in 1308. It was commonly called Le Decer's Fountain, in memory of John Le Decer, four times Mayor of Dublin, who paid for the construction of the cistern.

The first General Post Office of Ireland opened on High Street in 1688; it moved to Fishamble Street in 1689.

From the 18th century onward the urban core shifted eastwards, and High Street is no longer a shopping street. St Audoen's Church (Catholic) was built in the 1840s next to the ancient Protestant church.

An excavation took place in 1962–63; found were several Viking pieces of artwork: bone trial-pieces and a gilt bronze disc-brooch of the Borre Style design, a bronze needle case, and a soapstone ingot-mould. The trades practised in the Viking period (10th–11th century) included comb making, leather working and weaving.

The street was excavated again in 1968–71; finds included post and wattle houses, leather shoes and boots, bone objects, metalwork, pottery, coins, animal bones, a Rome pilgrim badge from the early 13th century, a lead seal of Pope Innocent III, a spoon bit, and wood-turning waste.

In the 1970s many of the street's commercial buildings were demolished so that it could be widened to a dual carriageway. For a period of time following the road widening, the street was mostly derelict and vacant sites. In 1993, Christ Church's synod hall was converted to Dublinia, a tourist attraction educating people about Viking Dublin.

Cultural references
High Street is mentioned in Sheridan Le Fanu's short story "Narrative of a Ghost of a Hand."

See also

List of streets and squares in Dublin

References

Streets in Dublin (city)